"Give In to Me" is a song by American recording artist Michael Jackson, released as the seventh single from his eight studio album, Dangerous (1991). Released in February 1993, the song peaked at number one in New Zealand for four consecutive weeks and at number two on the UK Singles Chart. The track features Guns N' Roses guitarist Slash, who also had solos on "D.S.", "Morphine" and "Privacy". Some suggest that the song has an aggressive sexual flavor. The single was released in Europe, Australia and New Zealand only. The single release's B-sides include the album versions of "Dirty Diana" and "Beat It".

Composition
This song is written in the key of E minor. Jackson's vocals spans from G3 to B4. It has a moderately slow tempo of 87 beats per minute. Stylistically, "Give In to Me" is a hard rock and heavy metal ballad.

Critical response
"Give In to Me" received positive reviews from contemporary music critics. Entertainment Weekly editor David Browne praised Jackson's delivery, writing, "when his voice isn't competing with drum machines, it's menacing on the creepy "Give In to Me" (his best-ever shot at hard rock)." In his weekly UK chart commentary, James Masterton said, that with "Who Is It" and "Black Or White", the single "is one of the few tracks on the album that represent Jackson at his very best and not stifled by machines." Alan Jones from Music Week described it as "a moody ballad which unfurls slowly before reaching a fine climax, neatly juxtaposed by Slash's wailing guitar solo." He added that it "will be a substantial and deserved hit." Alan Light of Rolling Stone felt that "Give In to Me" "flirts with something more disturbing as Jackson sings, "Don't try to understand me/Just simply do the things I say" in a grittier, throaty voice while Slash's guitar whips and soars behind him."

Music video

The music video for "Give In to Me" features Jackson performing the song on stage at an indoor rock concert with ex Living Colour bassist Muzz Skillings, Guns N' Roses guitarists Slash and Gilby Clarke, as well as the band's touring keyboardist Teddy Andreadis and legendary session drummer Tony Thompson. Loud explosions are later heard with visuals of stylized electrical arcs and Jackson dancing as they run down his body. The last scene shows one electrical arc running down Jackson's body, an unintentional effect that was left in. The video is featured on the video albums: Dangerous - The Short Films and Michael Jackson's Vision.

It was shot on June 25, 1992, in Munich, Germany, just two days before the opening concert of the Dangerous World Tour on June 27, 1992. The pyrotechnics appearing on the video are computer-generated and were added later on. It was published on YouTube in October 2009. The video has amassed over 145 million views as of March 2023.

Track listings
 Austria CD single
 "Give In to Me" – 5:28
 "Dirty Diana" – 4:52
 "Beat It" – 4:17

 UK CD single
 "Give In to Me" (Vocal Version) – 4:42
 "Dirty Diana" – 4:52
 "Beat It" – 4:17

 UK promo CD
 "Give In to Me" (Vocal Version) – 4:42
 "Give In to Me" (Instrumental) – 5:28

 45 RPM and 7-inch
 "Give In to Me" – 5:28
 "Dirty Diana" – 4:52

Personnel 
 Written, composed, and produced by Michael Jackson and Bill Bottrell
 Recorded, mixed, bass, drums, mellotron, and guitar by Bill Bottrell
 Guitars recorded by Jim Mitchell; assisted by Craig Brock
 Special guitar performance by  Slash
 Solo and background vocals by Michael Jackson
 Guitar by Tim Pierce

Charts and certifications

Weekly charts

Year-end charts

Certifications

Cover versions
In 2000, Eminem used the sample of "Give In to Me" in his song "Under the Influence" from the album The Marshall Mathers LP.
In 2009, Allison Iraheta performed the song on the eighth season of American Idol, and a studio recording was released on iTunes.
In 2012, Three Days Grace included a cover of this song on their album Transit of Venus.

References

1990s ballads
1991 songs
1993 singles
American hard rock songs
American heavy metal songs
Epic Records singles
Hard rock ballads
Heavy metal ballads
Michael Jackson songs
Number-one singles in New Zealand
Slash (musician) songs
Song recordings produced by Bill Bottrell
Song recordings produced by Michael Jackson
Songs about heartache
Songs written by Bill Bottrell